This is a list of high schools in Los Angeles County, California.

Catholic
Los Angeles City

 Bishop Alemany High School, Mission Hills
 Bishop Conaty-Our Lady of Loretto High School (girls), Harvard Heights
 Bishop Mora Salesian High School (boys), Boyle Heights
 Cathedral High School (boys), Elysian Park
 Chaminade College Preparatory School, West Hills
 Crespi Carmelite High School (boys), Encino
 Louisville High School (girls), Woodland Hills
 Loyola High School (boys), Harvard Heights
 Immaculate Heart High School (girls), Los Feliz
 Mary Star of the Sea High School, San Pedro
 Marymount High School (girls), Bel-Air
 Notre Dame Academy (girls), Rancho Park
 Notre Dame High School Sherman Oaks
 Sacred Heart High School (girls), Lincoln Heights
 St. Bernard High School, Playa del Rey
 St. Genevieve High School, Panorama City

Other cities

 Alverno High School (girls), Sierra Madre
 Bishop Amat Memorial High School, La Puente
 Bishop Montgomery High School, Torrance
 Cantwell-Sacred Heart of Mary High School, Montebello
 Damien High School (boys), La Verne, previously Pomona Catholic Boys High School
 Don Bosco Technical Institute (boys), Rosemead
 Flintridge Sacred Heart Academy (girls), La Cañada Flintridge
 Holy Family High School (girls), Glendale
 Junípero Serra High School, Gardena
 La Salle High School, Pasadena
 Mayfield Senior School of the Holy Child Jesus (girls), Pasadena
 Paraclete High School, Lancaster
 Pomona Catholic High School (girls), Pomona, previously Holy Name Academy
 Providence High School, Burbank
 Ramona Convent Secondary School (girls), Alhambra
 St. Anthony High School, Long Beach
 St. Francis High School (boys), La Cañada Flintridge
 St. John Bosco High School (boys), Bellflower
 St. Joseph High School (girls), Lakewood
 St. Lucy's Priory High School (girls), Glendora
 St. Mary's Academy (girls), Inglewood
 St. Monica Academy, Pasadena
 St. Monica High School, Santa Monica
 St. Paul High School, Santa Fe Springs
 St. Pius X - St. Matthias Academy (coed), Downey
 San Gabriel Mission High School (girls), San Gabriel

Other private schools
Protestant
 Bethel Christian High School, Lancaster
 Campbell Hall School, North Hollywood
 Desert Christian High School, Lancaster
 First Lutheran High School, Sylmar
 First Presbyterian School, Arcadia
 Frederick K.C. Price III Christian Schools, Los Angeles
 Glendale Adventist Academy, Glendale
 Hillcrest Christian School, Granada Hills
 Judson International School, Eagle Rock
 Lighthouse Christian Academy, Santa Monica
 Los Angeles Adventist Academy, Los Angeles
 Los Angeles Baptist High School, North Hills
 Los Angeles Lutheran High School, Sylmar
 Lutheran High School, La Verne
 Maranatha High School, Pasadena
 Oaks Christian School, Westlake Village
 Pacific Christian on the Hill, Los Angeles
 Pacific Lutheran High School, Torrance
 Pacifica Christian High School, Santa Monica
 Pilgrim School, Los Angeles
 San Gabriel Adventist Academy, San Gabriel
 Santa Clarita Christian School, Santa Clarita
 South Bay Lutheran High School, Inglewood
 Trinity Lutheran Junior/Senior School, Reseda
 Valley Christian High School, Cerritos
 Village Christian School, Sun Valley

Jewish
 Bais Chana High School (girls), Los Angeles
 Bais Yaakov of Los Angeles (girls), Los Angeles
 
 Mesivta of Greater Los Angeles (boys), Calabasas
Cofetz Chaim Los Angeles (Orh chanoch) Pico Robertson 

 Mesivta Birkas Yitzchok (boys), Los Angeles
 Milken Community School, Brentwood, Los Angeles
Yeshivas Ohev Shalom (Boys High School) Fairfax
 
 Netan Eli High School (boys), Los Angeles
 New Community Jewish High School (mixed), West Hills
 Machon Los Angeles Bass Yakkov
 Shalhevet High School (mixed), Los Angeles
 Valley Torah High School (boys), Valley Village
 Valley Torah Lintz High School (girls), Sun Valley
 Yeshiva Gedolah School of Los Angeles / Michael Diller High School (boys), Los Angeles
 Yeshiva High Tech, Los Angeles
 Yeshiva Ohr Elchonon Chabad High School (boys), Los Angeles
 Yeshiva University High School of Los Angeles (boys), Los Angeles
 Yeshiva University High School of Los Angeles (girls), Los Angeles

Non-denominational
 Advanced Education Academy, La Canada
 AGBU Vatche and Tamar Manoukian High School, Pasadena
 AGBU Manoogian-Demirdjian School, Canoga Park
 American University Preparatory School, downtown Los Angeles
 Archer School for Girls, Brentwood
 Armenian Mesrobian School, Pico Rivera
 Brentwood School, Brentwood
 Bridges Academy, Studio City
 Buckley School, Sherman Oaks
 Chadwick School, Palos Verdes Peninsula
 Crest View Academy, Santa Clarita
 Crossroads School, Santa Monica
 Delphi Academy of Los Angeles, Lake View Terrace
 Excelsior School, Pasadena
 Ferrahian Armenian School, Encino
 Flintridge Preparatory School, La Canada Flintridge
 Harvard-Westlake School, Holmby Hills, Studio City 
 Lycée Français de Los Angeles, Rancho Park – Palms
 Marlborough School, Hancock Park
 Oakwood School, North Hollywood
 Oxford School, Rowland Heights
 Polytechnic School, Pasadena
 Renaissance Academy, Altadena
 Ribet Academy, Glassell Park
 Rio Hondo Preparatory School, Arcadia
 Rose and Alex Pilibos Armenian School, Hollywood
 Sequoyah School, Pasadena
 Sierra Canyon School, Chatsworth
 STAR Prep Academy, Culver City
 STEM3 Academy, Valley Glen
 TCA Arshag Dickranian Armenian School, Hollywood
 Viewpoint School, Calabasas
 Village Glen High School, Sherman Oaks
 Vistamar School, El Segundo
 The Waverly School, Pasadena
 The Webb Schools, Claremont
 Westridge School for Girls, Pasadena
 Wild Wood High School, Los Angeles
 Wildwood School, Los Angeles
 Windward School, Mar Vista

Public schools

ABC Unified School District

 Artesia High School, Lakewood
 Cerritos High School, Cerritos
 Richard Gahr High School, Cerritos
 Gretchen Whitney High School, Cerritos
 Tracy High School, Cerritos

Acton-Agua Dulce Unified School District

Assurance Learning Academy (charter), Acton
 Vasquez High School, Acton

Alhambra Unified School District

 Alhambra High School, Alhambra
 Mark Keppel High School, Monterey Park
 San Gabriel High School, San Gabriel

Alliance for College-Ready Public Schools
 Alliance Alice M. Baxter College-Ready High School, Los Angeles
 College-Ready Academy High School#4, Los Angeles
 College-Ready Academy High School#6, Los Angeles
 College-Ready Math-Science School, Los Angeles
 Gertz-Ressler Academy High School, Los Angeles
 Heritage College-Ready Academy High School, Los Angeles
 Huntington Park College-Ready High School, Los Angeles
 Richard Merkin Middle Academy, Los Angeles

Antelope Valley Union High School District

 Antelope Valley High School, Lancaster
 Assurance Learning Academy (charter), Lancaster
 AV Academy High School (charter), Lake Los Angeles
 AV Academy High School (charter), Palmdale
 AV Learning Academy (charter), Lancaster
 Desert Sands Charter High School, Palmdale
 Desert Winds Continuation High School, Lancaster
 Eastside High School, Lancaster
 Highland High School, Palmdale
 Lancaster High School, Lancaster
 Littlerock High School, Littlerock
 Palmdale High School, Palmdale
 Pete Knight High School, Palmdale
 Quartz Hill High School, Quartz Hill
 R. Rex Parris Continuation High School, Palmdale

Arcadia Unified School District

 Arcadia High School, Arcadia

Azusa Unified School District

 Agvania High School
 Azusa High School, Azusa
 Gladstone High School, Covina

Baldwin Park Unified School District

 Baldwin Park High School
 North Park Continuation School
 Sierra Vista High School, Baldwin Park

Bassett Unified School District

 Bassett High School, La Puente

Bellflower Unified School District

 Bellflower High School, Bellflower
 Mayfair High School, Lakewood
 Somerset High School, Bellflower

Beverly Hills Unified School District

 Beverly Hills High School, Beverly Hills

Bonita Unified School District

 Bonita High School, La Verne
 San Dimas High School, San Dimas

Burbank Unified School District

 Burbank High School, Burbank
 John Burroughs High School, Burbank

Centinela Valley Union High School District

 Hawthorne High School, Hawthorne
 Lawndale High School, Lawndale
 Leuzinger High School, Lawndale

Charter Oak Unified School District

 Charter Oak High School, Covina

Claremont Unified School District

 Claremont High School, Claremont

Compton Unified School District

 Centennial High School, Compton
 Compton High School, Compton
 Dominguez High School, Compton
 Compton Early College, Compton

Covina-Valley Unified School District

 Covina High School, Covina
 Northview High School, Covina
 South Hills High School, West Covina

Culver City Unified School District

 Culver City High School

Downey Unified School District

 Columbus High School
 Downey High School, Downey
 Warren High School, Downey

Duarte Unified School District

 Duarte High School, Duarte
 California School of the Arts - San Gabriel Valley

El Monte Union High School District

 Arroyo High School, El Monte
 El Monte High School, El Monte
 Mountain View High School, El Monte
 Rosemead High School, Rosemead
 South El Monte High School, South El Monte

El Rancho Unified School District

 El Rancho High School, Pico Rivera

El Segundo Unified School District

 El Segundo High School, El Segundo

Glendale Unified School District

 Clark Magnet High School
 Crescenta Valley High School, La Crescenta
 Daily High School
 Glendale High School, Glendale 
 Herbert Hoover High School, Glendale

Glendora Unified School District

 Glendora High School, Glendora

Hacienda La Puente Unified School District

 Glen A. Wilson High School, Hacienda Heights
 La Puente High School, La Puente
 Los Altos High School, Hacienda Heights
 Puente Hills High School, La Puente
 Valley Alternative High School, La Puente
 William Workman High School, City of Industry

Inglewood Unified School District

 City Honors High School, Inglewood
 Inglewood High School, Inglewood
 Morningside High School, Inglewood
 Philippine Los Angeles High School, Inglewood

La Cañada Unified School District

 La Cañada High School, La Cañada Flintridge

Las Virgenes Unified School District

 Agoura High School, Agoura
 Calabasas High School, Calabasas

Long Beach Unified School District

 Cabrillo High School, Long Beach
 California Academy of Math and Science (CAMS) [on the CSU Dominguez Hills campus]
 Jordan High School, Long Beach
 Lakewood High School
 Long Beach Polytechnic High School, Long Beach
 Millikan High School, Long Beach
 Renaissance High School for the Arts
 Wilson Classical High School, Long Beach

Los Angeles Unified School District
See List of Los Angeles Unified School District schools

Lynwood Unified School District

 Firebaugh High School, Lynwood
 Lynwood High School, Lynwood

Manhattan Beach Unified School District

 Mira Costa High School, Manhattan Beach

Monrovia Unified School District

 Monrovia High School, Monrovia

Montebello Unified School District

 Applied Technology Center, Montebello
 Bell Gardens High School, Bell Gardens
 Montebello High School, Montebello
 Schurr High School, Montebello

Norwalk-La Mirada Unified School District

 El Camino High School, Whittier
 John Glenn High School, Norwalk
 La Mirada High School, La Mirada
 Norwalk High School, Norwalk
 Southeast Academy Military and Law Enforcement High School Norwalk

Palos Verdes Peninsula Unified School District

 Palos Verdes High School, Palos Verdes Estates
 Palos Verdes Peninsula High School, Rolling Hills Estates
 Rancho Del Mar High School, Rolling Hills

Paramount Unified School District

 Paramount High School, Paramount

Pasadena Unified School District

 Blair International Baccalaureate School, Pasadena (zoned)
 Marshall Fundamental Secondary School, Pasadena (open-enrollment school)
 Muir High School, Pasadena (zoned)
 Pasadena High School, Pasadena (zoned)

Pomona Unified School District

 Diamond Ranch High School, Pomona
 Franklin High School, Pomona
 Ganesha High School, Pomona
 Garey High School, Pomona
 Palomares High School, Pomona
 Pomona High School, Pomona
 Village Academy High School at Indian Hill, Pomona

Redondo Beach Unified School District

 Redondo Union High School, Redondo Beach

Rowland Unified School District

 John A. Rowland High School, Rowland Heights
 Nogales High School, La Puente
 Santana High School, Rowland Heights

San Gabriel Unified School District

 Del Mar High School, San Gabriel
 Gabrielino High School, San Gabriel

San Marino Unified School District

 San Marino High School, San Marino

Santa Monica-Malibu Unified School District

 Malibu High School, Malibu
 Olympic High School, Santa Monica
 Santa Monica High School, Santa Monica

South Pasadena Unified School District

 South Pasadena High School, South Pasadena

Temple City Unified School District

 Temple City High School, Temple City

Torrance Unified School District

 Kurt T. Shery High School, Torrance
 North High School, Torrance
 South High School, Torrance
 Torrance High School, Torrance
 West High School, Torrance

Walnut Valley Unified School District

 Diamond Bar High School, Diamond Bar
 Ron Hockwalt Academies, Walnut
 Walnut High School, Walnut

West Covina Unified School District

 Edgewood High School, West Covina
 West Covina High School, West Covina

Whittier Union High School District

 California High School, Whittier
 La Serna High School, Whittier
 Pioneer High School, Whittier
 Santa Fe High School, Santa Fe Springs
 Whittier High School, Whittier

William S. Hart Union High School District

 Academy of the Canyons, Santa Clarita
 Canyon High School, Santa Clarita
 Castaic High School, Castaic
 Golden Valley High School, Santa Clarita
 Saugus High School, Santa Clarita
 Valencia High School, Santa Clarita
 West Ranch High School, Stevenson Ranch
 William S. Hart High School, Santa Clarita

Other districts

 Assurance Learning Academy (charter), Los Angeles
 Assurance Learning Academy (charter), Wilmington
 Animo Inglewood Charter High School, Inglewood
 Animo Leadership Charter High School, Inglewood
 Animo Locke Technology High School, Los Angeles
 Booth High School, Los Angeles
 Carter-Walters Preparatory School of the Arts, San Dimas
 Crittenton High School, Los Angeles
 Da Vinci Schools, El Segundo
 Desert Sands Charter High School, Garden Grove
 Desert Sands Charter High School, Long Beach
 Desert Sands Charter High School, Norwalk
 Desert Sands Charter High School, Santa Ana
 Desert Sands Charter School, Lancaster
 Dr Olga Mohan High School, Los Angeles
 Environmental Charter High School, Lawndale
 Fred C. Nelles High School, Whittier
 International Polytechnic High School, Pomona
 Jack B. Clarke High School, Norwalk
 Los Angeles Complex Science Academy, Los Angeles
 Los Angeles County High School for the Arts, Los Angeles
 Mission View Public Charter, Gardena
 Mission View Public Charter, Inglewood
 Mission View Public Charter, Los Angeles
 Mission View Public Charter, North Hills
 Mission View Public Charter, Pacoima
 Mission View Public Charter, Panorama City
 Mission View Public Charter, San Fernando
 Mission View Public Charter, Santa Clarita (2 locations)
 Montclair College Preparatory School, Van Nuys
 Pacific Learning Center Charter, Long Beach
 Paramount High School Academy, Lakewood
 Pathway High School, Lynwood
 Promise Academy, Long Beach
 Soledad Enrichment Action Charter School, Los Angeles

See also 

 List of high schools in California
 List of high schools in Orange County, California
 List of high schools in San Diego County, California
 List of school districts in California
 List of school districts in California by county
 List of schools in the Roman Catholic Archdiocese of Los Angeles
 List of closed secondary schools in California

References

External links 
 List of high schools in Los Angeles County, California from SchoolTree.org
 Google Maps view of High Schools in Los Angeles Unified School District from Education.com
 Public and private high school information including school ranking and test scores from LosAngelesSchools.com

 
Los Angeles County